"James while John had had had had had had had had had had had a better effect on the teacher" is an English sentence used to demonstrate lexical ambiguity and the necessity of punctuation,
which serves as a substitute for the intonation, stress, and pauses found in speech.
In human information processing research, the sentence has been used to show how readers depend on punctuation to give sentences meaning, especially in the context of scanning across lines of text. The sentence is sometimes presented as a puzzle, where the solver must add the punctuation.

Meaning 
The sentence refers to two students, James and John, who are required by an English teacher to describe a man who had suffered from a cold in the past. John writes "The man had a cold", which the teacher marks incorrect, while James writes the correct "The man had had a cold". James's answer, being more grammatical, resulted in a better impression on the teacher.

The sentence is easier to understand with added punctuation and emphasis:

In each of the five "had had" word pairs in the above sentence, the first of the pair is in the past perfect form.  The italicized instances denote emphasis of intonation, focusing on the differences in the students' answers, then finally identifying the correct one.

Alternatively, the sentence can also be read as John's answer being better than James', simply by placing the same punctuation in a different arrangement through the sentence:

Usage
The sentence can be given as a grammatical puzzle or an item on a test, for which one must find the proper punctuation to give it meaning. Hans Reichenbach used a similar sentence ("John where Jack had...") in his 1947 book Elements of Symbolic Logic as an exercise for the reader, to illustrate the different levels of language, namely object language and metalanguage. The intention was for the reader to add the needed punctuation for the sentence to make grammatical sense.

In research showing how people make sense of information in their environment, this sentence was used to demonstrate how seemingly arbitrary decisions can drastically change the meaning, analogous to how changes in the punctuation and quotes in the sentence show that the teacher alternately prefers James's work and John's work (e.g., compare: 'James, while John had had "had", had...' vs. 'James, while John had had "had had", ...').

The sentence is also used to show the semantic vagueness of the word had, as well as to demonstrate the difference between using a word and mentioning a word.

It has also been used as an example of the complexities of language, its interpretation, and its effects on a person's perceptions.

For the syntactic structure to be clear to a reader, this sentence requires, at a minimum, that the two phrases be separated by using a semicolon, period, en-dash or em-dash. Still, Jasper Fforde's novel The Well of Lost Plots employs a variation of the phrase to illustrate the confusion that may arise even from well-punctuated writing:

See also
Buffalo buffalo Buffalo buffalo buffalo buffalo Buffalo buffalo
Lion-Eating Poet in the Stone Den
List of linguistic example sentences
That that is is that that is not is not is that it it is
Antanaclasis

References

External links
 

English phrases
Psycholinguistics
Word games
Homonymy
Ambiguity
Word play
Linguistic example sentences